Frank E. Jackson Jr. (born July 2, 1965) is an American film director, producer, and writer.  He is the founder of Sunjada Productions, a production company located in the Washington, DC  metropolitan area.

Early life

Jackson was born in Chicago, Illinois, the son of Ella Vaughnette Chambers.  He moved to Union City, Tennessee at an early age and graduated from high school in 1983.  He served four years in the United States Army before entering the Naval Defense Contracting field.  He spent twelve years on this career path and was working for L-3 GSI when he decided to pursue his film career on a full-time basis.

Film career
Jackson's first feature film, Lorenzo & Monica, L.A.F.S received a limited theatrical release through the AMC Magic Johnson Theater.  He was subsequently hired to direct three films, Painted Smiles, Prayer Life, and Feliz Cumpleanos, all of which were accepted at numerous film festivals.  In May 2007, he was hired to direct an urban gangster film entitled, Ex$pendable which starred Gary Sturgis, Taral Hicks, and William L. Johnson.  His most recent film, Conversations, features Tray Chaney, a regular on HBO's hit series, The Wire.

Festival selections and awards
Painted Smiles

Black International Film Festival
 Official Selection
Black Art Alliance Film Festival
 Official Selection
Caribbean International Film Festival
 Official Selection

Prayer Life

The WYSIWYG Christian Film Festival
 Jury Award
The Redemptive Film Festival
 Storyteller Award

Feliz Cumpleanos

Mid-Atlantic Black Film Festival
 Official Selection
Hollywood Black Film Festival
 Official Selection
San Diego Black Film Festival
 Official Selection
San Francisco Black Film Festival
 Official Selection
Arizona Black Film Festival
 Official Selection
Utopia Film Festival
 Official Selection
Martha's Vineyard Black Film Festival
 Official Selection
Spaghetti Junction Urban Film Festival
 Official Selection

Filmography

References

External links

Sunjada Productions Website
East West Films Profile
Bowie State Article
My Hound Profile
Lorenzo & Monica, L.A.F.S. Blog
Melisa Breiner-Sanders' Website
Kendall King's Website
Keith Gregory Blog Entry
Romero Wyatt's Website
Roger Payano's Website

Living people
1965 births
American film directors
Writers from Chicago